Arriva Yorkshire is a major bus operator providing services primarily within and across West Yorkshire, although it also provides service in some parts of South Yorkshire, East Riding of Yorkshire and southern areas of North Yorkshire. It is a subsidiary of Arriva UK Bus.

History

Arriva Yorkshire was formed as a combination of mergers of previous companies based in West and North Yorkshire.

In 1904 Yorkshire (West Riding) Electric Tramways began operating tram services in Wakefield followed in 1906 by Castleford. In November 1923 the West Riding Automobile Company began operating bus services in West Riding. Yorkshire Woollen District Transport, meanwhile, operated services around Dewsbury.

Both companies were acquired by the National Bus Company, along with Selby & District with the companies maintaining separate identities.  In 1987 West Riding Automobile and Yorkshire Woollen District were sold in a management buyout to Caldaire, under whose ownership they traded as West Riding Buses and Yorkshire Buses respectively. In 1994 South Yorkshire Road Transport, based in Pontefract, was purchased. The four companies were taken over by British Bus in 1995 which itself was purchased by Cowie Group in August 1996. All were rebranded under the Arriva brand in 1997.

From May 2008 until July 2021, there was a sister company in Huddersfield. Centrebus Holdings, in which Arriva held a 40% stake, was formed when the Huddersfield operations of Stagecoach Yorkshire was purchased along with the separate K-Line bus company. In September 2013, Arriva took full ownership of Centrebus Holdings and K-Line with the former rebranded Yorkshire Tiger and the latter as Tiger Blue. When Yorkshire Tiger was sold to Transdev Blazefield, routes 231 and 232 were not included and transferred to Arriva Yorkshire.

Brands

Arriva Yorkshire uses several different brands to differentiate their services. Sapphire, a premium brand, uses buses fitted with E-leather seats, free WiFi access, charging points, and audible and visual stop announcements, as well as dedicated drivers for each route. Max is similar to Sapphire, also using buses fitted with WiFi and E-leather seating. In Yorkshire, routes 126 and 127, from Dewsbury to Wakefield, 202 and 203, from Huddersfield to Leeds, 268, Wakefield to Bradford, and are MAX branded, whilst routes 110, from Wakefield to Leeds, 106, from Wakefield to Hall Green, 163 and 166, from Castleford to Leeds, and route 415, from Selby to York, 229, Huddersfield to Leeds are branded as Sapphire.

The third sub brand in use is Frequenta, which designates high frequency routes. Arriva Yorkshire currently use this on routes 148 and 149, running between Wakefield, Pontefract and Knottingley, with services running every 10 minutes.

Controversies
A widely reported case in 2008 concerned a gothic couple, Dani Graves and his fiancée Tasha Maltby, who wears a dog collar and lead. A driver had refused them travel and made comments to them, allegedly saying "We don't let freaks and dogs like you on." The company confirmed the couple were refused travel on two occasions due to "fears for passenger safety". In a statement the company addressed the issue, claiming that the dog lead was potentially dangerous. Arriva also said they would be writing to Mr Graves "to apologise for any distress caused by the way this matter was handled".

In January 2017, a wheelchair user was denied access to a Arriva Yorkshire bus by the driver, because a pushchair was occupying the wheelchair space. The incident occurred days after the Supreme Court ruled that drivers should prioritise the space for wheelchair users.

2022 strike action
In May 2022, 650 Unite the Union members working at Arriva Yorkshire depots voted in favour of indefinite strike action, beginning 6 June. Unite members were balloted on strike action following Arriva's offer of a 4.1% pay increase, which was below the 'real inflation rate' of 11.1%. No Arriva bus services operated in the region throughout the duration of the strike. Arriva Yorkshire apologised to customers for inconvenience caused by the strike, claiming their pay increase offer was "fair". 

Bus services briefly resumed on 2 July when the strike was suspended to allow union members to be balloted on an increased pay offer from Arriva, however the offer was rejected by 53.7% of union members, with the strike resuming on 13 July. Bus services would then resume two days later in what Unite called "an act of good faith" as the union began negotiations on a new pay offer from Arriva, promising 14 days notice of resumed strike action.

Fleet
 the fleet consisted of 334 buses.

Depots
Arriva Yorkshire operate five depots in Castleford, Dewsbury, Heckmondwike, Selby and Wakefield.

References

External links

 Company website

Yorkshire
Bus operators in South Yorkshire
Bus operators in the East Riding of Yorkshire
Bus operators in West Yorkshire
Companies based in Wakefield
Transport companies established in 1905
1905 establishments in England